Evens Stievenart is a French racing driver with significant experience in ice racing on the Andros Trophy Series. Sports enthusiast, he has recorded 3 victories at the 24 Hours of Le Mans; 2 on its solo cycling version in 2016 and 2017 and one on its Classic car version in 2018.

Car racing

The Trophée Andros is where Evens initially made his mark. In 2003, he won the Promotion Class with a Nissan Micra.

The highlights of his career are 2 victories in the SuperFinals in 2004 and in 2012 at the Stade de France with the Kia official Racing team and the Dacia official racing team.
He has also won 3 stage races and has finished on the podium on several occasions.

In 2018, he also participated for the first time in the Le Mans Classic Edition and won the race behind the wheel of a 908 LH Porsche.

His most notable teammates were the 4 time World Touring Car Cup World Champion Yvan Muller in 2004, 2005 and 2006 and the 4 time Formula One World Champion Alain Prost in 2011 and 2012.

Cycling

Still eager to push his limits, Evens has participated in many cycling races.

In 2012 he started to be involved in Ultra-distance cycling and took part in the Cape Epic raid 2012 in South Africa and completed the 8 day race.

In 2016, on his first attempt, he won the 24 heures du Mans Vélo in the Solo category, riding for 530 miles (853 km).

One year later, in August 2017, he won for the second time in a row. He shattered his own mark by setting a new record of 593 miles (950 km), the longest distance ever ridden in 24 hours on a bike, making him the unofficial world record holder.

Evens has won over 60 Road and Time Trial races in Category 1 of the UFOLEP Federation. Among those victories, he won the French Time Trial title in 2010 and added back to back victories in one of UFOLEP’s biggest stage race, Les Routes de l’Oise in 2016 and 2017.

In 2019, Evens and fellow countryman Jean-Luc Perez won the Race Across America in the 2-person category, setting a new record for the fastest average speed. They completed the 3082 miles (4960 km) in a total time of 6 days, 10 hours and 39 minutes at an average speed of 19.85 mph (31.95kmh)

Business

In 1999, Evens Stievenart started his professional career in the Familial Group of Magazine. He started to work as a photographer and later became chief editor.

In 2007, he was the Founder of Stadium Automobile Abbeville racing school, one of the most important racing schools in the north of France.

In 2010, Evens created the Karting stadium company, also based on the Abbeville racetrack site.

In 2011, he created Easydrift France, a company that imports the patented high-density ring technology that gives trainers the ability to teach “hands-on” skid recovery and advanced driving skills at low speed.

His skills on the racetrack, especially on slippery surface, allowed him to quickly develop the concept in France for road safety purposes and leisure activities.

Since 2013, Evens has been based in Los Angeles and works as a General Manager for the Exotics Racing California branch, located at the Auto Club Speedway.

Cycling record

2012 – Cape Epic
2016 – 24 hours of Le Mans Cycling - Solo Category - Winner
2016 – Routes de l’Oise – Winner
2017 – 24 hours of Le Mans Cycling - Solo Category - Winner
2017 – Routes de l’Oise – Winner
2019 – Race Across America - 2 men Category - Winner

Car Racing record

2000 – Rallye Cross Championship Formule France - 5th overall
2000 – FIA European Rallycross Championship - Citroen Saxo
2002 – Andros Trophy - Promotion category
2003 – Andros Trophy - Promotion category - Class winner
2003 – Porsche Carrera Cup Championship
2004 – Andros Trophy - Kia with Yvan Muller - 4th overall (2 victories, including the Super Finale in the Stade de France)
2005 – Andros Trophy - Kia with Yvan Muller - 6th overall
2005 – North American Ice Championship - Sherbrooke Canada - Winner
2006 – Andros Trophy - Kia with Yvan Muller - 5th overall
2008 – Andros Trophy - Kia - 2 podiums
2011 – Andros Trophy - Skoda with Olivier Panis and Jacques Villeneuve as teammates - Winner at Lans-en-Vercors
2012 – Andros Trophy - Dacia team with Alain Prost as teammate in the Dacia Lodgy.
2017 – Andros Trophy - Mazda - Winner at Andorra
2018 – Le Mans Classic - Porsche 908 - as Invited class

References

External links
Exotics Racing

French racing drivers
1983 births
Living people
Saintéloc Racing drivers